The Cult of Mac is a book by Leander Kahney. The book discusses fanaticism about the Apple product line and brand loyalty. Kahney released a later book titled The Cult of iPod.

The cover of the book features the Apple logo shaved into the back of a person's head.

See also
Apple evangelist
Reality distortion field
Criticism of Apple Inc.#Comparison with a cult

Footnotes 

Books about Apple Inc.
2004 non-fiction books
No Starch Press books